Fatehabad  Assembly constituency is  one of the 403 constituencies of the Uttar Pradesh Legislative Assembly,  India. It is a part of the Agra district and one of  the five assembly constituencies in the Fatehpur Sikri Lok Sabha constituency. First election in this assembly constituency was held in 1957 after the "DPACO (1956)" (delimitation order) was passed in 1956. After the "Delimitation of Parliamentary and Assembly Constituencies Order" was passed in 2008, the constituency was assigned identification number 93.

Wards  / Areas
Extent  of Fatehabad Assembly constituency is Fatehabad Tehsil.

Members of the Legislative Assembly

Election results

2022

2017

2012

See also
Agra district
Fatehpur Sikri Lok Sabha constituency
Sixteenth Legislative Assembly of Uttar Pradesh
Uttar Pradesh Legislative Assembly
Vidhan Bhawan

References

External links
 

Politics of Agra district
Assembly constituencies of Uttar Pradesh
Constituencies established in 1956